Prayers Of The Last Prophet is an album by Yusuf Islam.  The album is the follow-up to The Life of the Last Prophet, and contains a collection of du’as (supplications) as used by the Islamic prophet, Muhammad.

Track listing
Prayers: Introduction
Prayers: O Am Indeed Close
Prayers: O Son of Adam
Prayers: Praise Be to Allah
Prayers: Be Mindful of Allah
Prayers: Rabbi Ya Rahmnan
Prayers: Chief of Prayers
Night: Bedtime Prayer
Night: They Forsake Their Beds
Night: Night Prayer
Dawn: Call to Prayer
Dawn: Light
Dawn: The Morning Prayer
Dawn: If You Ask Me
Dawn: Let Not Our Hearts Deviate
Day: Istikharah
Day: Sovereignty
Day: Leaving Home
Day: Travel Prayers
Day: Visiting the Sick
Day: Seventy Thousand Angels
Day: Entering the Mosque
Day: Truly My Prayer
Day: Water, Ice and Snow
Day: Prostration
Day: Al-Tashahhud
Day: O Allah, Help Me
Day: Leaving the Mosque
Day: Rivalry in Worldly Increase
Day: Visiting the Graves
Evening: Entering the Home
Evening: Grant Us Wives and Offspring
Evening: Prayer for Children
Evening: Prayer for Parents
Evening: In Sa' Altu
Evening: Prayers for Eating
Evening: O My Servants
Evening: Prayers on the Prophet
Evening: Blessing on Muhammad
Evening: Salli 'Ala Muhammad

References

2003 albums
Spoken word albums by English artists
Yusuf Islam albums